Frederic Anthony Rzewski (April 13, 1938 – June 26, 2021) was an American composer and pianist, considered to be one of the most important American composer-pianists of his time. His major compositions, which often incorporate social and political themes, include the minimalist Coming Together and the variation set The People United Will Never Be Defeated!, which has been called "a modern classic".

Early life and education 
Rzewski was born on April 13, 1938, in Westfield, Massachusetts, to parents of Polish and Jewish descent, and raised Catholic. He began playing piano at age 5 and attended Phillips Academy, Harvard, and Princeton, where his teachers included Randall Thompson, Roger Sessions, Walter Piston, and Milton Babbitt. In 1960, he went to Italy on a Fulbright grant, a trip which was formative in his future musical development. In addition to studying with Luigi Dallapiccola in Florence on a Fulbright scholarship he began a career as a performer of new piano music, often with an improvisatory element.

Career 
In 1966, Rzewski co-founded Musica Elettronica Viva with Alvin Curran and Richard Teitelbaum in Rome. Musica Elettronica Viva conceived music as a collective, collaborative process, with improvisation and live electronic instruments prominently featured. In 1971, he returned to New York from Italy.

In 1977, Rzewski became Professor of Composition at the Conservatoire Royal de Musique in Liège, Belgium, then directed by Henri Pousseur. Occasionally, he taught for short periods at schools and universities throughout the U.S. and Europe, including Yale University, the University of Cincinnati, the California Institute of the Arts, the University of California, San Diego, the Royal Conservatory of The Hague, and Trinity College of Music, London.

Many of Rzewski's works were inspired by secular and socio-historical themes, show a deep political conscience and feature improvisational elements. His better-known works include The People United Will Never Be Defeated! (36 variations on the Sergio Ortega song "El pueblo unido jamás será vencido"); Coming Together, a setting of letters from Sam Melville, an inmate at Attica State Prison, at the time of the riots there (1972); North American Ballads (I. Dreadful Memories; II. Which Side Are You On?; III. Down by the Riverside; IV. Winnsboro Cotton Mill Blues) (1978–79); Night Crossing with Fisherman; Fougues; Fantasia and Sonata; The Price of Oil, and Le Silence des Espaces Infinis, both of which use graphical notation; Les Moutons de Panurge; and the Antigone-Legend. Rzewski's later compositions include Nanosonatas (2006–2010) and Cadenza con o senza Beethoven (2003), written for Beethoven's Fourth Piano Concerto. Rzewski played the solo part in the world premiere of his piano concerto at the 2013 BBC Proms.

Personal life and death 
In 1963, Rzewski married Nicole Abbeloos; they had four children. While Rzewski never divorced Abbeloos, his companion for about the last 20 years of his life was Françoise Walot, with whom he had two children. He also had five grandchildren. Rzewski died of an apparent heart attack in Montiano, Tuscany, Italy, on June 26, 2021, at the age of 83.

Appraisal 
Nicolas Slonimsky said of Rzewski in 1993: "He is furthermore a granitically overpowering piano technician, capable of depositing huge boulders of sonoristic material across the keyboard without actually wrecking the instrument." Michael Schell called Rzewski "the most important living composer of piano music, and surely one of the dozen or so most important living American composers".

In Christgau's Record Guide: Rock Albums of the Seventies (1981), Robert Christgau reviewed Coming Together/Attica/Moutons de Panurge, an album recorded with vocals by performance artist Steve Ben Israel and released in 1973 by Opus One Records. "The design of 'Coming Together' is simple, even minimal", Christgau said. "Steve ben Israel reads and rereads one of Sam Melville's letters from Attica over a jazzy, repetitious vamp. Yet the result is political art as expressive and accessible as Guernica. In ben Israel's interpretation, Melville's prison years have made him both visionary and mad, and the torment of his incarceration is rendered more vivid by the nagging intensity of the music. The [LP's] other side features a less inspiring political piece and a percussion composition, each likable but not compelling, but that's a cavil. 'Coming Together' is amazing."

Selected discography

As composer 
 Four North American Ballads, played by Paul Jacobs (Nonesuch Records on Paul Jacobs Plays Blues, Ballads & Rags D-79006 (LP) & 79006-2 (CD re-issue ) 1980(LP) 1993 (CD)
 The People United Will Never Be Defeated! and Winnsboro Cotton Mill Blues played by Michael Noble on American Dissident (198004840682) 2022.
 The People United Will Never Be Defeated!, played by Stephen Drury (New Albion NA 063) 1994
 The People United Will Never Be Defeated!, played by Marc-André Hamelin (Hyperion Records CDA67077) 1998
 The People United Will Never Be Defeated!, played by Corey Hamm (Redshift Records TK431) 2014
 De Profundis, 4 North American Ballads, played by Lisa Moore (Cantaloupe Music 21014) 2003
 Fred – Music of Frederic Rzewski played by Eighth Blackbird (Cedille CDR90000-084) 2005
 The People United Will Never Be Defeated!, played by Ralph van Raat (Naxos 8.559360) 2008
 The People United Will Never Be Defeated!, played by Christopher Hinterhuber (Paladino PMR0037) 2012
 Four Pieces, Hard Cuts and The Housewife's Lament played by Ralph van Raat et al. (Naxos 8.559759) 2014
 The People United Will Never Be Defeated! and Four Hands played by Ursula Oppens and Jerome Lowenthal (Cedille CDR90000-158) 2015
 The People United Will Never Be Defeated!, played by Igor Levit on Igor Levit plays Bach, Beethoven, Rzewski (Sony Classical 88875060962) 2015
 Songs of Insurrection, played by Thomas Kotcheff (Coviello Contemporary COV 92021) 2020
 Sometimes, played by Imani Winds on Bruits (Bright Shiny Things). 2021.
 Winnsboro Cotton Mill Blues, played by Christina Petrowska-Quilico on Retro Americana (Navona Records NAV6361) 2021.
 The Turtle and the Crane, played by Christina Petrowska-Quilico on Vintage Americana (Navona Records NAV6384) 2021.

As pianist 
 Anthony Braxton – Creative Orchestra Music 1976 (Arista, 1976) 
 Anthony Braxton – For Two Pianos (Arista, 1980 [1982]) 
 Marc-Henri Cykiert, Capriccio Hassidico (Igloo Records IGL095) 1991
 Cornelius Cardew – We Sing For The Future! 2001
 Tom Johnson – An Hour for Piano (1985)
 Henri Pousseur – Aquarius-Memorial (2001)
 Henri Pousseur – La Guirlande de Pierre (1995)
 Stockhausen – Klavierstück X (Wergo) 2014 CD re-issue
 Rzewski Plays Rzewski: Piano Works 1975–1999 (7-CD box set, Nonesuch, 2002)

Literature 
 Rzewski, Frederic. Nonsequiturs—Writings & Lectures on Improvisation, Composition, and Interpretation (Unlogische Folgerungen—Schriften und Vorträge zu Improvisation, Komposition und Interpretation). Edition Musiktexte, Cologne, 2007. .
 Петров, Владислав Олегович. Фредерик Ржевски: путь обновления традиций. Astrakhan: AIPKP, 2011, p. 100.
 Petrov, Vladislav O. Frederic Rzewski: upgrade path traditions. Astrakhan: AIPKP, 2011, p. 100.

References

Further reading 
 Murray, Edward. "Rzewski, Frederic" in The New Grove Dictionary of Music and Musicians, ed. Stanley Sadie. 20 vols. London: Macmillan Publishers Ltd., 1980. .
 Murray, Edward. "Rzewski, Frederic" in The New Grove Dictionary of Music and Musicians, second edition, edited by Stanley Sadie and John Tyrrell. 29 vols. London: Macmillan Publishers, 2001. .
 Schönmaier, Eleonore. "Fred's Dog" and "Nocturnes" in Dust Blown Side of the Journey. London: McGill–Queen's University Press, 2017.
 Zimmermann, Walter, Desert Plants – Conversations with 23 American Musicians, Berlin: Beginner Press in cooperation with Mode Records, 2020 (originally published in 1976 by A.R.C., Vancouver). The 2020 edition includes a cd featuring the original interview recordings with Larry Austin, Robert Ashley, Jim Burton, John Cage, Philip Corner, Morton Feldman, Philip Glass, Joan La Barbara, Garrett List, Alvin Lucier, John McGuire, Charles Morrow, J.B. Floyd (on Conlon Nancarrow), Pauline Oliveros, Charlemagne Palestine, Ben Johnston (on Harry Partch), Steve Reich, David Rosenboom, Frederic Rzewski, Richard Teitelbaum, James Tenney, Christian Wolff, and La Monte Young.

External links 
 Frog Peak Music (a composers' collective) has scores of some of Rzewski's compositions.
 Frederic Rzewski page on New Albion Records
 
 , which also hosts various live recordings of Rzewski playing his music.
 Frederic Rzewski at 80: Directions Inevitable or Otherwise at Second Inversion

Interviews 
 Duffie, Bruce. "Composer/Pianist Frederic Rzewski: A Conversation with Bruce Duffie". Interview from January 19, 1995.
 Golden, Barbara. "Conversation with Frederic Rzewski". eContact! 12.2 – Interviews (2) (April 2010). Montréal: CEC.
 Hoffman, Joel. The Rumpus Interview with Frederic Rzewski. The Rumpus (July 2015).
 Varela, Daniel. Interview with Frederic Rzewski. Perfect Sound Forever (March 2003).

1938 births
2021 deaths
20th-century classical composers
21st-century classical composers
Harvard University alumni
Princeton University alumni
American male classical composers
American classical composers
Contemporary classical music performers
American people of Polish descent
American people of Polish-Jewish descent
American classical pianists
Male classical pianists
American male pianists
Modernist composers
Composers for piano
Pupils of Roger Sessions
Pupils of Walter Piston
Members of the Academy of Arts, Berlin
Academic staff of the Royal Conservatory of Liège
21st-century American composers
20th-century American composers
20th-century American pianists
21st-century classical pianists
20th-century American male musicians
21st-century American male musicians
21st-century American pianists
Music & Arts artists
People from Westfield, Massachusetts
Phillips Academy alumni
Members of the American Academy of Arts and Letters